Canthigaster flavoreticulata is a species of pufferfish in the family Tetraodontidae. It is a tropical marine species associated with reefs. It is known only from Tonga, where it occurs at a depth range of 98 to 111 m (322 to 364 ft).

References 

flavoreticulata
Taxa named by Keiichi Matsuura
Fish described in 1986